The 30th American Society of Cinematographers Awards were held on February 15, 2016, at the Hollywood & Highland Ray Dolby Ballroom, honoring the best cinematographers of film and television in 2015.

The film nominees were announced on January 6, 2016. Roger Deakins received a record fourteenth nomination for Sicario, while Emmanuel Lubezki picked up his record fifth award for The Revenant.

Winners and nominees

Board of Directors Award
 Awarded to director and producer Ridley Scott.

Film

Outstanding Achievement in Cinematography in Theatrical Release
 Emmanuel Lubezki, ASC, AMC – The Revenant
 Roger Deakins, ASC, BSC – Sicario
 Janusz Kamiński – Bridge of Spies
 Edward Lachman, ASC, AMC – Carol
 John Seale, ASC, ACS – Mad Max: Fury Road

Spotlight Award
The Spotlight Award recognize[s] outstanding cinematography in features and documentaries that are typically screened at film festivals, in limited theatrical release, or outside the United States.

 Adam Arkapaw – Macbeth (TIE)
 Mátyás Erdély, HSC – Son of Saul (TIE)
 Cary Joji Fukanaga – Beasts of No Nation

Television

Outstanding Achievement in Cinematography in Episode of a Regular Series
 Vanja Černjul, ASC, HFS – Marco Polo (Episode: "The Fourth Step") (Netflix)
 David Greene, CSC – 12 Monkeys (Episode: "Mentally Divergent") (Syfy)
 Christopher Norr – Gotham (Episode: "Strike Force") (Fox)
 Crescenzo Notarile, ASC, AIC – Gotham (Episode: "Rise of the Villains: Scarification") (Fox)
 Fabian Wagner, BSC – Game of Thrones (Episode: "Hardhome") (HBO)

Outstanding Achievement in Cinematography in Television Movie, Miniseries, or Pilot
 Pierre Gill, CSC –  (Episode: "Pilot") (Amazon)
 Martin Ahlgren – Blindspot (Episode: "Who is Jane Doe") (NBC)
 James Hawkinson – The Man in the High Castle (Episode: "The New World") (Amazon)
 Jeff Jur, ASC – Bessie (HBO)
 Romain Lacourbas – Marco Polo (Episode: "The Wayfarer") (Netflix)

Other awards
 Career Achievement in Television: Lowell Peterson, ASC
 Presidents Award: Bill Bennett, ASC

References

2015
2015 film awards
2015 television awards
American
2015 in American cinema